Phaeomolis is a genus of moths in the family Erebidae.

Species

Phaeomolis bertrandi
Phaeomolis brunnescens
Phaeomolis curvenal
Phaeomolis lineatus
Phaeomolis obnubila
Phaeomolis obscurata
Phaeomolis ochreogaster
Phaeomolis polystria
Phaeomolis tavakiliani
Phaeomolis vampa

Former species
Phaeomolis similis

References
Natural History Museum Lepidoptera generic names catalog

Phaegopterina
Moth genera